Husimovci is a village in the municipality of Sanski Most, Federation of Bosnia and Herzegovina, Bosnia and Herzegovina.

Demographics 
According to the 2013 census, its population was 1,310.

References

Populated places in Sanski Most
Villages in the  Federation of Bosnia and Herzegovina